The Women's triple jump event  at the 2009 European Athletics Indoor Championships was held on March 6–8.

Medalists

Results

Qualification

Qualifying perf. 14.15 (Q) or 8 best performers (q) advanced to the Final.

Final

References
Results

Triple jump at the European Athletics Indoor Championships
2009 European Athletics Indoor Championships
2009 in women's athletics